Vice Admiral Sir William Geoffrey Arthur Robson,  (10 March 1902 – 25 December 1989) was a Royal Navy officer whose last Service appointment was Commander-in-Chief, South Atlantic.

Naval career
Educated at the Royal Naval College, Osborne, and the Royal Naval College, Dartmouth, Robson joined the Royal Navy as a cadet in 1915 during the First World War and served as a midshipman on the battleship .

Robson also served during the Second World War, initially as Commander of the destroyer  and then with combined operations from 1943 before commanding the 26th Destroyer Flotilla in 1944 and then Captain of Coastal Forces at The Nore in 1945.

After the War he was given command of the cruiser  and then, from 1948, of the Royal Navy Training Establishment HMS Ganges. Robson was appointed President of the Admiralty Interview Board in 1950, Flag Officer (Flotillas) for the Home Fleet in 1951 and then Flag Officer Scotland and Northern Ireland in 1953. He went on to be Commander-in-Chief, South Atlantic in 1956.

He was made a Knight Commander of the Order of the British Empire in 1956.

At Freetown in early 1957,  wore Vice-Admiral Robson's flag as Commander-in-Chief, South Atlantic. Veryan Bay proceeded to Plymouth, arriving on 11 March 1957, and was then paid-off.

Sir Geoffrey Robson retired in 1958. In retirement he served as Lieutenant Governor and Commander-in-Chief of Guernsey from 1958 to 1964.

References

Further reading 
 "Vice-Admiral Sir Geoffrey Robson", The Times (London), 1 January 1990, p. 12.

|-

|-

1902 births
1989 deaths
People educated at the Royal Naval College, Osborne
Graduates of Britannia Royal Naval College
Royal Navy officers of World War II
Royal Navy vice admirals
Knights Commander of the Order of the British Empire
Companions of the Order of the Bath
Companions of the Distinguished Service Order
Recipients of the Distinguished Service Cross (United Kingdom)